Ten Kate Racing is a motorcycle racing team competing in World Supersport with 2023 rider Jorge Navarro and Stefano Manzi. They previously competed in the Superbike World Championship with 2019 rider Loris Baz, and previously with Gulf Althea Racing BMW Motorrad.

The re-built team participated in a part-season from June.

Ten Kate had the official backing of Honda for 18 years until late 2018, being their presence in both World Superbikes and World Supersport series, with reports of Honda's sudden withdrawal causing team bankruptcy.

Ten Kate raced a team as the Red Bull Honda World Superbike Team, a squad sponsored by Red Bull, using Honda superbike motorcycles in the Superbike World Championship.

History

Foundation 
Gerrit ten Kate was a full-time motocross rider, who like many undertook his own mechanics. After semi-retirement from his own career, he guided his nephew Ronald ten Kate through regional motocross series to fourth place in the Dutch national championship. Having founded a workshop undertaking mechanics for other riders during his career, it was noticed that Ronald's bike was fast, which resulted in Gerrit expanding his workshop to the point where he was selling and maintaining 50/60 bikes per annum.

In 1993, Gerrit gave up his own motocross activities to concentrate on developing his motorcycle dealership Ten Kate Motorcycles in Nieuwleusen, near Zwolle in the north of the Netherlands. Soon after foundation, local road racing rider Harry van Beek came to the showroom looking for help, so Gerrit fixed it. Van Beek got a wildcard entry in the European Superstock round at Hockenheim, where he found he had the fastest bike. As a result, from 1994 Ten Kate entered road racing maintenance.

Road Racing 

From 1995, the team entered its own team in regional Dutch road racing. Managed by Ronald ten Kate, each season Ten Kate Racing has increased in scope and size, and now takes a team of 28 - including technicians, administrative staff and four riders - to contest the World Superbike and Supersport champ:

In  Ten Kate rider Fabien Foret won the championship, Honda's first in Supersport.

The team went on to win all of the last six Supersport World Championships using the Honda CBR600RR. Also in 2008 Ten Kate wins with Andrew Pitt.

In  the team also moved up to the Superbike World Championship using the Honda CBR1000RR and Chris Vermeulen as its single rider. Despite being a privateer entry with no support from Honda who had withdrawn its support from the Superbike World Championship, Chris Vermeulen finished fourth in the championship with four wins and was in contention for the title until the final round of the season.

Vermeulen managed 6 wins and finished the championship runner-up while Muggeridge had a poorer season and finished 11th.

Toseland finished the season runner-up with 3 race wins, while teammate Karl Muggeridge once again had a poorer season finishing 12th.

In  James Toseland was joined in the team by Roberto Rolfo. Toseland got 8 race wins and won the championship in the final race of the season by a margin of 2 points. Rolfo finished 8th overall.

For  the team continues to use Honda motorcycles, CBR1000RR in Superbikes, and CBR600RR for Supersport.

With James Toseland moving to MotoGP, former MotoGP rider Carlos Checa and 2 times British Superbike Champion Ryuichi Kiyonari join the team, while  Supersport World Champion Kenan Sofuoğlu will ride a third motorcycle under the banner of Hannspree Ten Kate Honda Jr.

Kenan Sofuoğlu and  Supersport World Champion Andrew Pitt ride for the team in the 2009 Supersport World Championship.

Honda has announced its plans for the 2013 World Superbike and World Supersport championships, which include a new four-rider line-up, a comprehensive technical development and testing programme and a new title sponsor.

In the World Superbike championship, current rider Jonathan Rea has signed with the team once more and will team-up with fellow Briton Leon Haslam on the Honda CBR1000RR Fireblade. In the World Supersport championship, Italian Lorenzo Zanetti will ride Honda's CBR600RR alongside Michael van der Mark from the Netherlands.

Italian snack manufacturer Pata is the new title sponsor of the reinvigorated squad which will be known as the Pata Honda World Superbike and Pata Honda World Supersport teams. Both groups will once again be run by the Netherlands-based Ten Kate organisation.

For Jonathan Rea, 2013 will mark a fifth year on Honda's CBR1000RR Fireblade and his sixth season of racing with Ten Kate. The 25-year-old has enjoyed a spectacular and busy 2012, combining his World Superbike duties – including wins at Assen and Donington Park – with getting married and winning the Suzuka 8-hour race.

More recently, Northern Irishman Rea has replaced the injured Casey Stoner in the Repsol Honda MotoGP team, riding back-to-back Grands Prix with the final three rounds of World Superbike.

Haslam, 29, returns to Honda's CBR machinery after a three-year absence to continue a strong family link to the Japanese manufacturer. It was begun by his father, Ron, who won Formula 1 world championships and raced with Honda in 500cc Grands Prix.

With his own 250cc and 500cc GP experience, the younger Haslam, from Derbyshire in the UK, has been racing in the World Superbike championship since 2009 and was runner-up in the 2010 series. He has amassed a total of 28 podium finishes, including three race wins.

Lorenzo Zanetti is from Brescia in Italy and has been in the World Superbike paddock for three years, but began his career with Honda, winning the RS125 GP Cup in Italy in 2004. The 25-year-old finished third in the 2011 Superstock 1000 championship and has spent the 2012 season competing in the World Superbike series with a best result of eighth last time out at the Nurburgring in Germany.

Michael van der Mark. the 19-year-old from Gouda in the Netherlands began his career racing in the Dutch 125cc Junior Cup and has spent the last five years on Honda machinery.

World Supersport

Results

References

External links 
 Ten Kate Racing
 Ten Kate Motoren in Dutch

Superbike racing
Motorcycle racing teams
Red Bull sports teams
Motorcycle racing teams established in 1995
1995 establishments in the Netherlands